is a former baseball player from Japan. Yudai Deguchi played in the Pacific League for the Fukuoka Daiei Hawks

References

1971 births
Living people
People from Amagasaki
Japanese baseball players
Nippon Professional Baseball outfielders
Yomiuri Giants players
Fukuoka Daiei Hawks players
Fukuoka SoftBank Hawks players